This is a list of disbarments affecting notable lawyers in the United States.

References

Disbarred lawyers
Disbarred lawyers